Historical Biology is a peer-reviewed scientific journal of paleobiology. It was established in 1988, and is published by Taylor & Francis. The journal is edited by Gareth J. Dyke (National Oceanography Centre).

Abstracting & Indexing  
The journal is abstracted and indexed in the following databases.

According to the Journal Citation Reports, the journal has a 2020 impact factor of 2.259.

References

External links

Biology journals
Taylor & Francis academic journals
Publications established in 1988
Paleontology journals
8 times per year journals